Buford High School is a public, four-year, comprehensive high school located in Buford, Georgia, United States, in the Gwinnett area of Northside Atlanta

History
Buford High School was opened in 1948.

In 2009, it was awarded a silver award by the State of Georgia Governor's Office of Achievement for "Highest Percentage of Students Meeting and Exceeding Standards".

Academics
For the 2010-2011 school years, the school had the highest passing rate in the Georgia Graduation Test, with 96% passing. Buford also ranks in the top 6% of students who pass AP courses.. A part of the greater Buford City Schools System, Buford was ranked by reviewers on the review site Niche as the top school system in the state.

Athletics
Buford has won state championships in the following:
 Baseball (1977, 2011, 2015)
 Boys' basketball (2017, 2019)
 Girls' basketball (2009, 2010, 2011, 2015, 2017, 2018, 2019, 2020)
 Football (1978, 2001, 2002, 2003, 2007, 2008, 2009, 2010, 2012, 2013, 2014, 2019, 2020, 2021)
 Gymnastics (2014, 2015, 2016, 2022)
 Softball (2007, 2008, 2009, 2010, 2011, 2012, 2013, 2014, 2015, 2016, 2022)
 Volleyball (2015, 2016, 2020, 2021, 2022)
 Wrestling, traditional (2014, 2017, 2018, 2021, 2022)
 Wrestling, duals (2014, 2018, 2021, 2022)
Girls Track (2017, 2018, 2019)

Arts
The literary team, choral music program, and theater program at Buford High School have been very successful. The literary team has won seventeen Georgia High School Association State Literary Championships (1976, 1980, 1982, 1985, 2005, 2007, 2009, 2010, 2011, 2012, 2013, 2014, 2015, 2016, 2017, 2018, 2019, 2020, 2021, 2022). The literary team holds the all time GHSA record for consecutive literary team championships, winning their eleventh consecutive title in 2019. The theater program, competing in the Georgia High School Association One-Act Play, has won four state championships (2011, 2013, 2016, 2018). The choral program is one of the finest in Georgia, contributing to multiple state literary championships and performing at the 2020 Georgia Music Educators Association Inservice Conference. Three of the state events in the 2018 literary championship were won by singers from the choral department at Buford High. The Girls Trio set a new GHSA all-time record by winning their seventh consecutive state title in 2018.

Notable alumni
 Vadal Alexander, former NFL football player
 Joey Bart, MLB baseball player
 Andraya Carter, sports journalist and former college basketball player
 Sam Clay, MLB baseball player
 Kaela Davis, former WNBA basketball player
 Blake Ferguson, NFL football player
 Reid Ferguson, NFL football player
 Storm Johnson, former NFL football player
 Brandon Marsh,  MLB baseball player
 Isaac Nauta, NFL football player
 Justin Roper, college football coach and former AFL football player
 Lorne Sam, former NFL football player
 P. K. Sam, former CFL and NFL football player
 Christi Thomas, former WNBA basketball player
 Darius Walker, former NFL football player
 Tim Wansley, former NFL football player

References

Public high schools in Georgia (U.S. state)
Schools in Gwinnett County, Georgia
Educational institutions established in 1948
Buford, Georgia
1948 establishments in Georgia (U.S. state)